The House in the Night is a children's picture book written by Susan Marie Swanson and illustrated by Beth Krommes. Published in 2008, the book is a bedtime verse about the light in a house during the night. Krommes won the 2009 Caldecott Medal for her illustrations.

References

Caldecott Medal–winning works
2008 children's books
American picture books
Books about night